Raw is a live album by Australian singer Jimmy Barnes. The album was recorded live at Colonial Stadium in Melbourne, Australia on 24 March 2001 and released in November 2001. The album peaked a number 57 on the ARIA charts.

Track listing
Standard edition
 "Love & Hate"
 "Seven Days"
 "Land of a Thousand Dances"
 "All the Young Dudes"
 "Lay Down Your Guns"
 "Khe Sanh"
 "Cheap Wine"
 "I Put a Spell on You"
 "Bow River"
 "Working Class Man"

Bonus tracks
There are also four bonus tracks included on the album, which were recorded live at Shepherd's Bush Empire on 1 August 2001:
 "Stone Cold"
 "Goin' Down Alone"
 "I'd Die to Be with You Tonight"
 "Do or Die"

Charts

References

Jimmy Barnes albums
2001 live albums